Kowloon Central was a geographical constituencies in the election for the Legislative Council of Hong Kong in 1995, which elects one member of the Legislative Council using the first-past-the-post voting system. The constituency covers Kowloon City District and Wong Tai Sin District in Kowloon.

The constituency was divided and replaced by the Kowloon East and Kowloon West constituencies in 1998 after the handover of Hong Kong a year before.

Returned members
Elected members are as follows:

Election results

References 

Constituencies of Hong Kong
Kowloon
Constituencies of Hong Kong Legislative Council
1995 establishments in Hong Kong
Constituencies established in 1995